Odostomia azteca is a species of sea snail, a marine gastropod mollusc in the family Pyramidellidae, the pyrams and their allies.

Distribution
This species is distributed in the Pacific Ocean off Central Americas.

References

External links
 To World Register of Marine Species

azteca
Gastropods described in 1939